The Wellington Classic (also known by its corporate title of the Fernleaf Classic) is a defunct WTA Tour affiliated tennis tournament played from 1988 to 1992. It was held in Wellington in New Zealand and was played on outdoor hard courts. Between 1990 and 1992 the tournament was part of the WTA Tier V Series

The only New Zealander to taste success at the event was Julie Richardson in the 1991 doubles competition, partnering Australian Jo-Anne Faull.

Prize money

Finals

Singles

Doubles

External links
 WTA Results Archive

 
WTA Tour
Hard court tennis tournaments
Tennis tournaments in New Zealand
Sport in Wellington City
Defunct tennis tournaments in Oceania
Defunct sports competitions in New Zealand